Roscius may refer to:

People 
Lucius Roscius (5th century BC), murdered Roman envoy
Marcus Roscius Coelius (1st century BC), Roman military officer
Quintus Roscius Gallus (ca. 126 BC – 62 BC), famous Roman actor
William Henry West Betty (1791–1874), actor known as the "Young Roscius"
Ira Aldridge (1807–1867), actor known as the "African Roscius"
Sextus Roscius (1st century BC), Roman farmer accused of parricide and successfully defended by Cicero

Other uses 
 Roscius (bug), a genus of true bugs in the family Pyrrhocoridae